Now That's What I Call Running or Now Running is a triple-disc compilation album which was released in the United Kingdom on 5 March 2012.

Track listing

Disc 1

Disc 2

Disc 3

Charts

Certifications

Release history

References

External links
Official site

2012 compilation albums
Running
Sony Music compilation albums
EMI Records compilation albums
Universal Music Group compilation albums
Warner Music Group compilation albums